Laurie Allen is a Canadian curler.

In 2011, she was inducted into Manitoba Curling Hall of Fame together with all members of Connie Laliberte teams of 1992 and 1995.

Awards
Scotties Tournament of Hearts Sportsmanship Award:  (in 1993 it named as "Mabel Mitchell Award")

Teams and events

References

External links

Laurie Allen – Curling Canada Stats Archive

Living people
Canadian women curlers
Canadian women's curling champions
Curlers from Winnipeg
Year of birth missing (living people)
20th-century Canadian women